Namibia held elections for their local and regional councils on 26 and 27 November 2010. The terms of regional councillors and local authority representatives were originally set to expire in 2009. As a local and regional election in 2009 would have meant to organise four different elections in one year, this part of the election was postponed and terms of office extended by one year.

Regional election
Regional elections contested 101 seats in 13 regional councils.

Local election
Local elections determine the population of the village, town, and city councils and have a direct influence on who will become mayor, as this position is elected among all councillors. Contrary to the regional elections, local elections in Namibia are determined by party, not by individual. There are 50 local authorities in Namibia with a total of 327 seats.

The ruling SWAPO Party obtained representation in all local councils and won 226 seats all in all. Rally for Democracy and Progress (RDP), the official opposition, managed to get into 36 local councils with a total of 48 seats in them.

References

2010 in Namibia
Local and regional elections in Namibia
Namibia